Roy Erskine (born September 1931) is a Scottish former professional footballer who played as a full back. Erskine made a total of 46 appearances in the Scottish Football League.

Career
After completing his spell of national service, Erskine began his football career with Hibernian. He played in some other first team matches, including an East of Scotland Shield Final, but never made a league appearance for the team. Erskine later played for Peebles Rovers, Stirling Albion and Cowdenbeath. In Roy's nine league games for Stirling Albion, two of them were against Rangers. Both games were played in Stirling.  The first was on 5 March 1955 and ended in a 2-0 victory for Rangers.  The second game was on 22 October 1955 and ended in a 2-2 draw.

Personal life
An optician by profession, Roy Erskine is the maternal grandfather of professional tennis players Jamie and Andy Murray by his daughter Judy Murray. Erskine himself was a tennis player, but he was prohibited by the Scottish tennis authorities from continuing that sport actively after he became a professional footballer.

References

1931 births
Living people
Scottish footballers
Hibernian F.C. players
Peebles Rovers F.C. players
Stirling Albion F.C. players
Cowdenbeath F.C. players
Scottish Football League players
Association football fullbacks
Date of birth missing (living people)